The Syrian national handball team is the national handball team of Syria and is controlled by the Syrian Arab Handball Federation.

Competition record

Asian Championship
 Champions   Runners up   Third place   Fourth place

Asian Games
2006: 5th

West Asian Games
2002:  Silver medal 
2005: 4th

Pan Arab Games
1965:  Bronze medal
1976:  Gold medal

Mediterranean Games
1987: 4th
2001: 9th

Islamic Solidarity Games
2005: 4th

Players
Nahil Rajab
Lousy Koureyh
Jihan Bilal
Mervat Maksoud
Rima Bitar
Ragda Bakri
Zenab Sido
Marcel Mahfoud
Kifah Rabah
Hind Saqr
Hyam Mousa
Omar Buric
Sani Aletovic
Muaz Kusic 
Sulejmen Brkic

References

External links
IHF profile

 

Men's national handball teams
Handball